Howell is a surname and given name originating from Wales. As a surname, it is not particularly common among those of Welsh ancestry, as it is an anglicized form of the Welsh name Hywel. It originates in a dynasty of kings in Wales and Brittany in the 9th and 10th century, most notably king Hywel Dda ("Howel the Good") and three Welsh royal houses of that time onwards. The royal House of Tudor was also descended from them. Today, nearly 200,000 people bear this surname.

Etymology and history

Welsh origin 
The name Howell originates from the Welsh masculine given name, Hywel, meaning "eminent" or "prominent", derived from the Old Welsh given name, Higuel. Literally meaning, hy- (“good”) +‎ gwêl (“sight”), "well-seen".

The first known recording of the name comes in the Anglo-Saxon Chronicle, referring to a Brittonic king known as Huwal of the West Welsh in 926 AD. Many scholars believe this to be referring to the 10th century law giving Welsh king, Hywel Dda, to which many Howells claim their descent from. He is the most famous historical bearer of the name, and was recorded with the title King of the Britons by 950 AD.

Howell as a surname is derived from the name of an ancestor, meaning the "son of Hoel" (and variants). Its original Welsh form would use the prefix ap, for example: Owain ap Hywel ("Owain son of Hywel"). The Latin motto for the Howell family name is Virtus in arduo ("valour in difficulty"). Howell (and its variant forms) as a given name has been popular in honour of Hywel Dda since the Middle Ages.

In Geoffrey of Monmouth's 12th century pseudohistorical Historia regum Britanniae, there is mention of a late 5th and early 6th century Brittonic king known as Hywel the Great, said to be born in around 500 AD. This is the earliest claimed account of the name, although Hywel the Great is generally considered as legendary, he appears in Welsh mythology and the Matter of Britain as a "king of Brittany". He is considered a Welsh saint and was said to have been a relative of the legendary King Arthur.

In England 
After the English Conquest of Wales in the 13th century, followed by the Laws in Wales Acts 1535 and 1542 in the 16th century, Wales was incorporated into the Kingdom of England. This resulted in the migration of Howells into Western England from Wales, particularly in counties along the Anglo-Welsh border. Many settlers anglicized their surnames from their original Welsh forms, such as "Hywel" to instead "Howell". In the Eastern English counties, the name was brought by Breton settlers after the Norman Conquest. The Breton forms of the name were Houuel, Huwel, Huwal, and Howael. There is also a claim for the surname having separate English origins, from the place-name Howell found in Lincolnshire and derived from the Old English, hugol meaning “mound” or “hillock.”

In the British Empire 
As a result of English colonialism and subsequently, the British Empire, descendants of the Howell family name can be found across the world. Today, It is most prevalently found in the core Anglosphere countries, such as the United Kingdom, the United States, Canada, Australia and New Zealand. However, during the period of slavery in the British colonies, many slaves were known by the surname of their masters, or adopted those surnames upon their emancipation. Some descendants of these formerly enslaved peoples, continue to bear these surnames today, particularly in countries in the West Indies.

Geographical distribution 

As of 2014, over 74.0% of all known bearers of the surname Howell were residents of the United States, 12.3% are in the British Isles (10.4% in England, 1.3% in Wales, 0.2% in Scotland, 0.2% in Ireland, 0.2% in Northern Ireland) 4.6% in Australia, 3.0% in Canada, 1.7% in Jamaica, 0.8% in South Africa and 0.7% in New Zealand.

Notable people with the name include:

Surname

A 

 Ada Verdun Howell (1902–1981), Australian author and poet
 Albert Howell (cricketer) (1898–1958), English cricketer
 Alfred Brazier Howell (1886–1961), American zoologist, primarily a mammalogist
 Algie Howell (born 1938), American Democratic politician
 Alice Howell (1886–1961), American silent movie actress
 Anthony Howell (actor) (born 1971), British TV actor
 Anthony Howell (performance artist) (born 1945), British performance artist
 Arlene Howell (born 1939), American TV actress
 Arthur H. Howell (1872–1940), American zoologist

B 

 Bailey Howell (born 1937), American basketball player
 Benny Howell (born 1988), English cricketer
 Benjamin Franklin Howell (1844–1933), American Republican politician
 Benjamin Hunting Howell (1875–unknown), American rower
 Beryl A. Howell (born 1956), American judge
 Bill Howell (American football) (1905–1981), American football player
 Bill Howell (cricketer) (1869–1940), Australian cricketer
 Blue Howell (1905–1964), American football player
 Brett Harland Howell, British musician
 Buddy Howell (born 1996), American football player

C 

 C. Thomas Howell (born 1966), American actor
 Carla Howell (born 1955), American Libertarian politician
 Cedric Howell (1896–1919), Australian fighter pilot
 Charles Howell (British politician) (1905–1974), British Labour politician and member of Parliament
 Charles Howell III (born 1979), American golfer
 Charles Andrew Howell III (1930–2011), American businessman
 Charles Augustus Howell (1840–1890), British-Portuguese art dealer
 Charles Henry Howell (c. 1824 – 1905), British architect
 Charles R. Howell (1904–1973), American politician and member of the House of Representatives
 Charmaine Howell (born 1975), Jamaican athlete
 Christopher Howell (born 1945), American poet
 Christopher Howell (cricketer) (born 1977), English cricketer
 Clarence Howell (1881–1936), American chess master
 Clark Howell (1863–1936), American newspaper man and politician
 Clement Howell (1935–1987), Turks and Caicos politician
 Colin Howell (born 1959), Northern Irish murderer

D 

 Daedalus Howell (born 1972), American writer
 Daniel Howell (born 1991), British vlogger and BBC Radio 1 presenter
 Daniel Howell (Wisconsin politician) (1807–1890), Wisconsin state senator
 David Howell, Baron Howell of Guildford (born 1936), British Conservative politician
 David Howell (British Army officer), British barrister and officer
 David Howell (chess player) (born 1990), British chess grandmaster
 David Howell (priest) (1831–1903), British clergyman
 David Howell (footballer) (born 1958), English footballer
 David Howell (golfer) (born 1975), English golfer
 David Howell (jurist) (1747–1824), American jurist
 David Howell (rugby league) (born 1983), Australian rugby league player
 Dean Howell (born 1980), English footballer
 Deborah Howell (1941–2010), American journalist
 Delles Howell (born 1948), American football player
 Denis Howell, Baron Howell (1923–1998), British Labour politician
 Dixie Howell (1912–1971), American football player
 Dixie Howell (catcher) (1920–1990), American baseball player
 Dixie Howell (pitcher) (1920–1960), American baseball player
 Dorothy Howell (composer) (1898–1982), British composer and pianist
 Dorothy Howell (screenwriter) (1899–1971), American screenwriter

E 

 Edward Howell (disambiguation), several people
 Edwin C. Howell (1860–1907), American whist and chess player
 Edwin E. Howell (1845–1911), American geologist and cartographer
 Elias Howell (1792–1844), American politician
 Ella Howell (born 1994), English singer-songwriter
 Evan Howell (1839–1905), American politician, early telegraph operator and officer in the Confederate Army

F 

 Frances Schumann Howell (1905–1994), American artist
 Francis Howell (disambiguation), several people
 Francis Clark Howell (1925–2007), American anthropologist

G 

 Gareth Howell (born 1981), Welsh racing driver
 Gary Howell (West Virginia politician) (born 1966), member of the West Virginia House of Delegates
 Gary Howell (Michigan politician), member of the Michigan House of Representatives
 George Evan Howell (1905–1980), American Republican politician
 George Howell (entrepreneur) (born 1945), American entrepreneur
 George Howell (Pennsylvania politician) (1859–1913), American Republican politician
 George Howell (trade unionist) (1833–1911), British politician and trade unionist
 George Howell (soldier) (1893–1964), Australian soldier
 George Howell Kidder (1925–2009), American lawyer
 Gerran Howell (born 1991), Welsh actor
 Gillian Howell (1927–2000), British architect
 Graham Howell (born 1951), English footballer
 Gwynne Howell (born 1938), British opera singer

H 

 Douglass Morse Howell (1906–1994), American papermaker and artist
 Hannah Howell (born 1950), American romance novelist
 Harry Howell (baseball) (1876–1956), American baseball player
 Harry Howell (cricketer) (1890–1932), English cricketer and footballer
 Harry Howell (ice hockey) (born 1932), Canadian ice hockey player
 Henry Howell (1920–1997), American Democratic politician
 Henry Howell (Mormon) (1828–1896), British-American settler
 Horatio Stockton Howell (1820–1963), American chaplain

I 

 Ian Howell (born 1958), South African cricketer and umpire

J 

 Jack Howell (baseball) (born 1961), American baseball player
 Jack Howell (footballer) (1924–1994), Australian rules football player
 Jack Howell (swimmer) (1899–unknown), American swimmer
 Jack P. Howell (1895–unknown), Australian rules football player
 James Howell (disambiguation), several people
 Jamie Howell (born 1977), English footballer
 Janet Howell (born 1944), American Democratic politician
 Jay Howell (born 1955), American baseball player
 Jennifer Howell, Canadian-American voice actor
 Jeremiah B. Howell (1771–1822), U.S. Senator from Rhode Island
 Jim Lee Howell (1914–1995), American football player
 Joe Howell, American songwriter
 John Howell (defensive back) (born 1978), American football player
 John Howell (halfback) (1915–unknown), American football player
 John Howell (politician) (born 1955), British Conservative politician
 John Adams Howell (1840–1918), American naval officer
 John Cummings Howell (1819–1892), American naval officer
 John H. Howell, American officer
 John McDade Howell (born 1922), American professor
 John Thomas Howell (1903–1994), American botanist
 John White Howell (1857–1937), American electrical engineer
 Jordan Charles Howell, British musician
 Joseph Howell (1857–1918), American Republican politician
 Joseph Toy Howell III (born 1942), American author
 Joshua B. Howell (1806–1864), American officer
 J. P. Howell (born 1983), American baseball player

K 

 Kathleen Howell, American engineer
 Ken Howell (born 1960), American baseball player
 Krista Howell, Canadian politician

L 

 Lane Howell (born 1941), American football player
 Larry Howell, American mechanical engineer
 Laura Howell, British comic book artist
 Lenzie Howell (1967–2020), American basketball player
 Leonard Howell (1898–1981), Jamaican religious figure, founder of Rastafari movement
 Leonard Howell (footballer) (1848–1895), English footballer
 Lis Howell (born 1951), British journalist
 Llorne Howell (born 1972), New Zealand cricketer
 Lottice Howell (1897–1982), American singer and actress
 Luke Howell (born 1994), Australian film actor

M 

 Margaret Howell (born 1946), British fashion designer
 Mark Howell (born 1952), American musician
 Markus Howell (born 1975), Canadian football player
 Mary Howell (1932–1998), American physician and psychologist
 Matilda Howell (1859–1938), American archer
 Max Howell (1921–2012), Australian rules footballer
 Max Howell (educator) (1927–2014), Australian educator and rugby union player
 Mike Howell (born 1943), American footballer
 Miles Kristian Howell, British musician
 Morton B. Howell (1834–1909), American politician
 Myfanwy Howell, Welsh broadcaster

N 

 Nancy R. Howell (born c. 1955), American educator
 Nathaniel W. Howell (1770–1851), American Federalist politician
 Neville Howell, Australian rower
 Nick Howell (born 1986), American football player

P 

 Pat Howell (born 1957), American football player
 Pat Howell (baseball) (born 1968), American baseball player
 Paul Howell (disambiguation)
 Peg Leg Howell (1888–1966), American blues singer and guitarist
 Peter Howell (musician) (born c. 1948), British musician and composer
 Peter Howell (actor) (1919–2015), British actor
 Peter Howell (historian) (born 1941), British historian

R 

 Rab Howell (1869–1937), British footballer
 Ralph Howell (1923–2008), British Conservative politician
 Red Howell (1909–1950), American baseball player
 Richard Howell (1754–1802), American politician; governor of New Jersey from 1794 to 1802
 Richard Howell (basketball) (born 1990), American-Israeli basketball player in the Israeli Basketball Premier League
 Richard Howell (comics), American comic book creator
 Richard Howell (cricketer) (born 1982), English cricketer
 Richard Howell (swimmer) (1903–1967), American swimmer
 Rob Howell, British costume and set designer
 Robert B. Howell (1864–1933), American Republican politician
 Rod Howell (born 1975), American dancer
 Roger Howell Jr. (1936–1989), American professor
 Roland Howell (1892–1973), American baseball player
 Ron Howell (Canadian sportsman) (1935–1992), Canadian football and ice hockey player
 Ron Howell (footballer, born 1949), English footballer
 Ron Howell (Australian footballer) (1919–2015), Australian rules footballer
 Rosemary Jessamyn Howell, Australian lawyer and academic
 Roy Howell (born 1953), American baseball player
 Rufus K. Howell (1820–1890), Justice of the Louisiana Supreme Court
 Russ Howell, American skateboarder

S 

 Sam Howell (born 2000), American football player
 Scott Howell (disambiguation), multiple people

T 

 Taylor Morgan Howell, British musician
 Thomas Howell (bishop) (1588–1650), British clergyman
 Thomas Howell (poet), British poet
 Thomas Bayly Howell (1767–1815), English lawyer and writer who lent his name to Howell's State Trials
 Thomas J. Howell (botanist) (1842–1912), American botanist
 Tommy Howell, English rugby league footballer who played in the 1890s and 1900s

V 

 Valma Howell (1896–1979), Australian artist
 Varina Howell (1826–1906), First Lady of the Confederate States of America; wife of CSA President Jefferson Davis
 Verdun Howell (born 1936), Australian rules footballer
 David Koresh (born Vernon Howell) (1959–1993), American leader of Branch Davidians religious sect

W 

 Walter Howell (born 1929), Australian rower
 Wayne Howell (1921–1993), American voice-over announcer
 William Howell (rugby player) (1863–unknown), Welsh rugby union player
 William Henry Howell (1860–1945), American physiologist
 William J. Howell (born 1943), American Republican politician
 William R. Howell, American businessman
 William Roe Howell (1846–1890), American photographer
 William Thompson Howell (1810–1870), American jurist and politician
 W. Nathaniel Howell (born 1939), U.S. Ambassador to Kuwait, 1987–1991

Y 

 Yvonne Howell (1905–2010), American actress

King of Wales 

 Howell the Good (c. 880 – 950)

Given name 

 Howell Appling Jr. (1919–2002), American businessman and Republican politician
 Howell Binkley, American lighting designer
 Howell Cheney (1870–1957), American businessman
 Howell Cobb (1815–1868), American political figure
 Howell Cobb (born 1772) (1772–1818), American politician
 Howell Cobb (judge) (1922–2005), American judge
 Howell Davies (1851–1932), British Liberal politician
 Howell Davies (rugby), Welsh rugby player
 Howell Davis (c. 1690–1719), British pirate
 Howell de Francis, Welsh rugby league player
 Howell M. Estes II (1914–2007), American general
 Howell M. Estes III (born 1941), American general
 Howell M. Forgy, USN chaplain
 Howell Glynne (1906–1969), British opera singer
 Howell Arthur Gwynne (1865–1950), British newspaper editor
 Howell Hansel (1860–1917), American film director
 Howell Harris (academic), British history professor
 Howell Heflin (1921–2005), American Democratic politician
 Howell Hollis, American golf coach
 Howell Edmunds Jackson (1832–1895), American jurist and politician
 Howell Jones (1882–1908), Welsh rugby union player
 Howell Lewis (1888–1971), Welsh rugby union player
 Howell Elvet Lewis (1860–1953), Welsh poet and hymn-writer
 Howell W. Melton (born 1923), American judge
 Howell W. Melton Jr. (born 1951), American lawyer
 Howell Oakdeane Morrison (1888–1984), American musician
 Howell Peacock (1889–1962), American basketball coach
 Howell Peregrine (1938–2007), British mathematician
 Howell Raines (born 1943), American journalist, former Executive Editor of the New York Times
 Howell Tatum (died 1822), Justice of the Tennessee Supreme Court
 Howell Tong (born 1944), Hong Kong statistician
 Howell Arthur John Witt (1920–1998), Australian clergyman

Others named Howell 

 Samuel Howell Ashbridge (1848–1906), American Republican politician
 John Howell Collier (1900–1974), American general
 Harrison Howell Dodge (1852–1937), American curator
 The Edge (real name David Howell Evans) (born 1961), British-Irish musician
 Patricia Gibson-Howell (born 1966), British actress
 Richard Howell Gleaves (1819–1907), American politician
 Rees Howell Gronow (1794–1865), British soldier
 Robert Howell Hall (1921–1995), American judge
 John Howell Morrison (composer) (born 1956), American composer
 William Howell Pegram (1846–1928), American chemist
 David Howell Petraeus (born 1952), American general & CIA director
 Walter Rice Howell Powell (1819–1889), British politician
 Luis Howell-Rivero, Cuban biologist
 Dorothy Howell Rodham (born 1919), American political matriarch
 Frank Howell Seay (born 1938), American judge
 Cedric Howell Swanton (1899–1970), Australian psychiatrist
 William Howell Arthur Thomas (1895–1979), Canadian Progressive Conservative politician
 Crawford Howell Toy (1836–1919), American scholar
 Anderson Howell Walters (1862–1927), American Republican politician

Fictional characters 

 Brutus "Brutal" Howell, prison guard played by David Morse in The Green Mile
 Claire Howell, prison guard played by Kristin Rohde on TV's Oz
 Thurston Howell III, millionaire played by Jim Backus on TV's Gilligan's Island
 Lovey Howell, wife of Thurston, played by Natalie Schafer on Gilligan's Island
 Elliot Howell III, fictional Hindenburg passenger credited to Colby Chester in the eponymous film
 Howell Jenkins, an alter ego of Wizard Howl in the fantasy trilogy Howl's Moving Castle
 Carl Howell, in the TV series Glee, played by John Stamos

See also 

 Hywel the Great, legendary King of Brittany whose name is sometimes spelled as Howel
 Powell (surname)
 Howell (disambiguation)
 Howells (disambiguation)
 Welsh surnames

References 

English-language surnames
Welsh-language surnames
Anglicised Welsh-language surnames